Farrow & Ball is a British manufacturer of paints and wallpapers largely based upon historic colour palettes and archives. The company is particularly well known for the unusual names of its products.

History
The company was started by John Farrow and Richard Maurice Ball in 1946 in Wimborne Minster, Dorset. Both Farrow and Ball had previously been chemists.

Products

Paint 
Farrow & Ball maintains an updated colour card of 132 colours. The company has worked with the National Trust in formulating near-exact matches of colours used in the restoration of the interiors and exteriors of historic buildings. ].

Wallpaper 
Farrow & Ball produces wallpaper patterns made using traditional block, trough and roller methods with the company's own paint.

Books 
Farrow & Ball has produced several books; the British National Bibliography contains the following records:
 Paint and Colour in Decoration (2003)
 Farrow & Ball The Art of Colour (2007)
 Farrow & Ball Living with Colour (2010)
 Farrow & Ball Decorating with Colour (2013)
 Farrow & Ball How to Decorate (2016)
 Farrow & Ball Recipes for Decorating (2019)

Showrooms and stockists
The company has 63 showrooms across the UK, US, Canada and Europe, as well as a global network of stockists carrying both paint and wallpaper.

In popular culture
Farrow & Ball has been lampooned in the US for its expense and preparation requirements on NBC's Saturday Night Live.

In 2021, Channel 5 broadcast a one episode documentary about Farrow & Ball entitled Farrow & Ball: Inside the Posh Paint Factory.

Corporate information

Ownership 
In 2006, American Capital subsidiary European Capital Limited purchased Farrow & Ball for approximately £80 million by way of a management buyout. Until its sale to European Capital Limited, Farrow & Ball remained a family business. In 2014, Ares Management bought Farrow & Ball from European Capital Limited for £275 million. In October 2020, Bloomberg reported that Ares Management was considering a potential sale of Farrow & Ball. In May 2021, the Financial Times reported that Danish coatings manufacturer Hempel had agreed to purchase Farrow & Ball from Ares Management for approximately £500 million. The sale was expected to complete in the second half of 2021. On 26 August 2021 the Competition and Markets Authority (CMA) completed the phase one investigation it launched on 9 July 2021 and cleared the merger. Following clearance by the CMA, the sale of Farrow & Ball by Ares Management to Hempel completed on 3 September 2021.

Financial information

References

Bibliography
Friedman, Joseph. Paint and Color in Decoration. Rizzoli New York: 2003. .

External links

Color space
Paint and coatings companies of the United Kingdom
Color
Historic preservation
Interior design
English brands
Chemical companies established in 1946
British companies established in 1946
1946 establishments in England
Companies based in Dorset